UFC on ESPN: Luque vs. Muhammad 2 (also known as UFC on ESPN 34 and UFC Vegas 51) was a mixed martial arts event produced by the Ultimate Fighting Championship that took place on April 16, 2022, at the UFC Apex facility in Enterprise, Nevada, part of the Las Vegas Metropolitan Area, United States.

Background 
A welterweight rematch between Vicente Luque and Belal Muhammad headlined the event. The pair previously met at UFC 205, where Luque won the bout via first-round knockout.

A lightweight bout between Drakkar Klose and Nikolas Motta was briefly link to the event. However, Motta was removed from the event for undisclosed reasons and replaced by Brandon Jenkins.

A welterweight bout between Miguel Baeza and Dhiego Lima was scheduled for the event. However, Lima announced his retirement from competition in early February and was replaced by André Fialho.

A featherweight bout between Melsik Baghdasaryan and T.J. Laramie was originally booked for UFC 268, but Laramie had an MRSA infection and it was postponed. They were then expected to meet at this event. In turn, Baghdasaryan pulled out due to unknown reasons and Laramie was matched up against Pat Sabatini.

A lightweight bout between Victor Martinez and Jordan Leavitt was scheduled for the event. However, Martinez withdrew from the event due to unknown reasons and was replaced by Trey Ogden.

Uriah Hall was expected to meet André Muniz in a middleweight bout at the main card. However on April 2, Hall withdrew due to undisclosed reasons. Muniz was also pulled after promotion wasn't able to find him a replacement.

A welterweight bout between Elizeu Zaleski dos Santos and Mounir Lazzez was expected to take place at the event. However, Zaleski dos Santos withdrew the week of the fight due to personal reasons. He was replaced by Ange Loosa.

Results

Bonus awards 
The following fighters received $50,000 bonuses.
 Fight of the Night: Mayra Bueno Silva vs. Wu Yanan
 Performance of the Night: André Fialho and Drakkar Klose

See also 

 List of UFC events
 List of current UFC fighters
 2022 in UFC

References 

UFC on ESPN
2022 in mixed martial arts
April 2022 sports events in the United States
2022 in sports in Nevada
Mixed martial arts in Las Vegas
Sports competitions in Las Vegas